Selmsdorf is a municipality in the Nordwestmecklenburg district, in Mecklenburg-Vorpommern, Germany located east of Lübeck.

It is also close to the cities of Wismar and Schwerin and is part of the Hamburg Metropolitan Region.

References

External links
Selmsdorf Municipal Page

Nordwestmecklenburg